Jolfa County is in East Azerbaijan province, Iran. The capital of the county is the city of Jolfa. At the 2006 census, the county's population was 52,176 in 14,186 households. The following census in 2011 counted 55,166 people in 16,103 households. At the 2016 census, the county's population was 61,358 in 19,443 households.

Administrative divisions

The population history of Jolfa County's administrative divisions over three consecutive censuses is shown in the following table. The latest census shows two districts, five rural districts, and three cities.

References

 

Counties of East Azerbaijan Province